Matthew Neil Franco (born August 19, 1969 in Santa Monica, California) is an American former professional baseball player who played first base in the major leagues from 1995 to 2003, and in Nippon Professional Baseball from 2004 to 2006.

Early career
Franco grew up in Westlake Village, California, playing youth soccer with future USMNT players Eric Wynalda and Cobi Jones. He was a standout baseball player at Westlake High and was drafted out of high school.

Franco started his professional career in 1987 with the Rookie League Wytheville Cubs in the Appalachian League. He started the 1988 season in short season rookie ball, again with the Wytheville Cubs. He hit .392 and was promoted to the Low Level A ball New York/Penn League. He played for the Winston-Salem Spirit of the Carolina League in 1991. Franco moved up to Double-A and for the next two seasons played for the Chicago Cubs Double-A affiliates in the Southern League, first with the Charlotte Knights in 1992, and then the Orlando Cubs in 1993.

Franco moved up to Triple-A in 1993. After starting the season in Orlando, he ended the season in Des Moines with the Iowa Cubs of the American Association. Franco would return to the Iowa Cubs the next season before breaking into the majors with the Chicago Cubs in 1995.

Major leagues
On July 10, 1999, with the Mets trailing the Yankees by one run with two outs and two strikes in the bottom of the ninth, Franco came up with a pinch-hit single off of Mariano Rivera to score two runs and give the Mets a 9–8 win.

Franco holds the major league record with 20 pinch hit walks in a season.

PED use
On December 13, 2007, he was named in the Mitchell Report to the Commissioner of Baseball of an Independent Investigation Into the Illegal Use of Steroids and Other Performance Enhancing Substances by Players in Major League Baseball.

Personal life
Franco lives in Simi Valley, California. He is the son of film producer Larry Franco and Jill Russell, a sister of actor Kurt Russell, which makes Franco a grandson of actor Bing Russell.

See also
 List of Major League Baseball players named in the Mitchell Report

References

External links

1969 births
Living people
New York Mets players
Chicago Cubs players
Atlanta Braves players
Charlotte Knights players
Richmond Braves players
Winston-Salem Spirits players
Peoria Chiefs players
Geneva Cubs players
Iowa Cubs players
Charleston Wheelers players
Norfolk Tides players
Orlando Cubs players
American expatriate baseball players in Japan
Chiba Lotte Marines players
Major League Baseball first basemen
Major League Baseball third basemen
Major League Baseball outfielders
Baseball players from Santa Monica, California
Sportspeople from Ventura County, California
Wytheville Cubs players